Lebiinae is a subfamily of ground beetles in the family Carabidae. There are more than 330 genera and 6,300 described species in Lebiinae, in 5 tribes.

Lebiinae tribes
 Cyclosomini Laporte, 1834
 Lachnophorini LeConte, 1853
 Lebiini Bonelli, 1810
 Odacanthini Laporte, 1834
 Perigonini G.Horn, 1881

References

External links

 

 
Carabidae subfamilies